"The Trouble with Trillions" is the twentieth episode in the ninth season of the American animated television series The Simpsons. It originally aired on the Fox network in the United States on April 5, 1998. It was written by Ian Maxtone-Graham and directed by Swinton O. Scott III. The episode sees Homer being sent by the Federal Bureau of Investigation to try to obtain a trillion dollar bill that Mr. Burns failed to deliver to Europe during the post-war era.

Plot
All of Springfield celebrates the arrival of the New Year except for Ned Flanders, who instead focuses on filing his tax returns. A few months later, as all of Springfield rushes to send out their returns just before midnight on April 15, Homer realizes he did not file his. He rushes and provides false information before delivering it to the post office. However, at the IRS the somewhat spherical package containing Homer's tax returns bounces into a “Severe Audit” bin, and the government arrests him for tax fraud. To avoid prison, Homer agrees to help Agent Johnson of the FBI. With a hidden microphone under his shirt, Homer uncovers that his coworker Charlie is leading a militia planning to assault all government officials, and has him arrested by the FBI for conspiracy.

Impressed, Johnson reveals to Homer that in 1945, President Harry S. Truman printed a one trillion-dollar bill to help reconstruct post-war Western Europe and enlisted Montgomery Burns to transport the bill. However, it never arrived and the FBI suspects Burns still has it with him. Homer is sent in to investigate. At the Burns estate, Homer searches for the bill before Burns, who believes Homer is a reporter from Collier's magazine, reveals that he keeps it in his wallet. Johnson and Agent Miller burst in and arrest Burns, who, insisting he's innocent, protests that the government oppresses the average American. Moved by Burns' speech, Homer knocks out the FBI agents and frees Burns.

The two men go to Smithers, who suggests they leave the country. Burns takes Smithers and Homer in his old plane, setting off to find an island and start a new country. The three land in Cuba and appear before Fidel Castro. Burns tries to buy the island, but Castro foils his plan when he asks to see the trillion-dollar bill and then refuses to give it back. Later, Burns, Smithers, and Homer are on a makeshift raft. Smithers asks whether Burns will be facing jail time; Burns replies that, if it is a crime to love one's country or steal a trillion dollars or bribe a jury, he is guilty.

Production
The episode was written by Ian Maxtone-Graham, though the original draft of the plot was much different. Originally, Homer was to learn that he was a Native American, and would try to exploit it to not have to pay taxes. The idea had been going well for a few days, but the staff did not actually know whether Native Americans had to pay taxes. When the writers found out that they did, the whole plot had to be scrapped. Executive producer Mike Scully's brother Brian pitched the idea of the trillion-dollar bill, which they accepted, as they were out of ideas.

Cultural references
The episode's title is a reference to the Star Trek episode "The Trouble with Tribbles".

The scene where the FBI agent sits near Homer is a reference to the film JFK.

While Homer, Mr. Burns, and Smithers are in Cuba, a billboard can be seen with a picture of Marxist revolutionary Che Guevara being used to advertise Duff Beer.

Reception
In its original broadcast, "The Trouble with Trillions" finished 51st in ratings for the week of March 30–April 5, 1998, with a Nielsen rating of 7.5, equivalent to approximately 7.4 million viewing households. It was the third highest-rated show on the Fox network that week, following World's Wildest Police Videos and Melrose Place.

Since airing, the episode has received mixed reviews from television critics. The authors of the book I Can't Believe It's a Bigger and Better Updated Unofficial Simpsons Guide, Warren Martyn and Adrian Wood, did not enjoy the episode, calling it, "Rather dull and unfunny", adding, "A mediocre episode at best that makes Burns out to be altruistic (which he's not) and very stupid in letting Castro have his money (which he so wouldn't)." The Daily Telegraph characterized the episode as one of "The 10 Best Simpsons TV Episodes". The article noted the episode contained "one of the few gags in comedy history about relying too heavily on surveillance photography in spying".

Ian Jones and Steve Williams for Off the Telly criticized all of season 9 for lacking an episode that centered on Burns, as they consider Burns to be the crux of many good episodes, though they noted that "The Trouble with Trillions" came the closest, with Burns having a supporting role. In a review of The Simpsons ninth season, Isaac Mitchell-Frey of the Herald Sun described the episode as "brilliant", and highlighted it along with episodes "Bart Carny" and "The Joy of Sect".

In the United Kingdom, the episode was screened on BBC Two in January 1999, before any other episode from season six or later were seen by viewers on the channel, as part of a night of Cuba-themed programming. The episode had made its UK premiere in June 1998, by the program's primary rights holder in the country, Sky One.

See also

 "The Trouble with Tribbles", an episode of Star Trek
 Large denominations of United States currency
Trillion-dollar coin
Taxation in the United States
Marshall Plan
JFK (1991)
Cuba
Cuba–United States relations

References

External links

 
 

1998 American television episodes
Television episodes set in Cuba
Cultural depictions of Fidel Castro
Havana in fiction
The Simpsons (season 9) episodes
Federal Bureau of Investigation in fiction
New Year television episodes